Hawkins Mountain is a  double-summit massif located in Kittitas County of Washington state. Hawkins Mountain is the sixth-highest point in the Teanaway area of the Wenatchee Mountains. The lower (7,080-ft) east summit is also known as Hawkins Thimble. Precipitation runoff from the peak drains into tributaries of the Teanaway River and Cle Elum River. This mountain was named for prospector Samuel S. Hawkins.

Climate

Lying east of the Cascade crest, the area around Hawkins Mountain is a bit drier than areas to the west. Summers can bring warm temperatures and occasional thunderstorms. Most weather fronts originate in the Pacific Ocean, and travel east toward the Cascade Mountains. As fronts approach, they are forced upward by the peaks of the Cascade Range, causing them to drop their moisture in the form of rain or snowfall onto the Cascades (Orographic lift). As a result, the eastern slopes of the Cascades experience lower precipitation than the western slopes. During winter months, weather is usually cloudy, but, due to high pressure systems over the Pacific Ocean that intensify during summer months, there is often little or no cloud cover during the summer.

See also

 Geology of the Pacific Northwest

References

External links
 Hawkins Mountain:  weather forecast

Mountains of Kittitas County, Washington
Mountains of Washington (state)
Wenatchee National Forest
Cascade Range
North American 2000 m summits